Isola Bella (Sicilian: Ìsula Bedda) is a small island near Taormina, Sicily, southern Italy.  Also known as The Pearl of the Ionian Sea, it is located within a small bay on the Ionian Sea; it was a private property, for a time owned by Florence Trevelyan, until 1990, when it was bought by the Region of Sicily, being turned into a nature reserve, administrated by the Italian branch of the World Wide Fund for Nature. There is a narrow path that often connects the island to the mainland beach. The island is surrounded by sea grottos and has a small and rather rocky beach which is a popular destination for sunbathers.

History
King Ferdinand I of the Two Sicilies gifted the island to the nearby town of Taormina in 1806. The island was in 1890 bought from the town by Trevelyan, who built a small house facing the sea and imported exotic plants, which thrived in the Mediterranean climate. Subsequent owners kept up the island, until the owner went bankrupt, and auctioned the island in 1990. The island had been noted by conservationists as early as 1983, and it was quickly obtained by the region and designated as a protected natural site. The island is home to several species of birds, and a few types of lizards.

References

See also
 History of Taormina

Islands of Sicily
Nature reserves in Italy
Taormina
Mediterranean islands
Ionian Sea